Ulf Lehmann (born 4 February 1958) is a German former sailor. He competed in the Flying Dutchman event at the 1988 Summer Olympics.

References

External links
 

1958 births
Living people
German male sailors (sport)
Olympic sailors of East Germany
Sailors at the 1988 Summer Olympics – Flying Dutchman
People from Ostprignitz-Ruppin
Sportspeople from Brandenburg